Specklinia calderae is a species of orchid plant native to Colombia.

References 

calderae
Flora of Colombia